Juan José Gómez Camacho (born October 6, 1964) is a Mexican diplomat. Ambassador Juan José Gómez-Camacho was appointed as Permanent Representative of Mexico to the United Nations in New York in February 2016.  From 2019 to 2022 he served as Mexican ambassador to Canada.

A career diplomat, Gómez-Camacho joined the Mexican Foreign Service in 1988. Since then, he has held different positions both within the Ministry of Foreign Affairs and overseas.

Education
Gómez Camacho studied law at Universidad Iberoamericana and holds a master's degree in International Law from Georgetown University.

Diplomatic career
Camacho joined the Mexican Foreign Service in 1988.

At the Ministry of Foreign Affairs, among other positions, he worked as Director General for Human Rights and Democracy (December 2000 to December 2005), where he implemented the modernization of Mexico’s foreign policy in the fields of human rights and democracy, and served as Mexico’s attorney of record on international human rights litigation. He was in charge of the legal affairs at the Mexican Embassy in the United Kingdom. In the Ministry of Foreign Affairs, as Director General for Human Rights and Democracy, he was responsible of the Mexican foreign policy in such issues, as well as Mexico's attorney for international disputes, among other positions.

He served as Ambassador to the Republic of Singapore, the Union of Myanmar and the Sultanate of Brunei Darussalam from 2006 to 2009. From August 2009 until December 2013 he was appointed Permanent Representative of Mexico to the United Nations and other international organizations based in Geneva, Switzerland.

In December 2013, he was appointed Ambassador of Mexico to the European Union and the Ambassador of Mexico to Belgium and Luxembourg. From 2013 to 2016 he served in that capacity, until his appointment as Ambassador and Permanent Representative to the United Nations in New York.

During his posting as the permanent representative of Mexico to the UN and other International Organizations in Geneva he had a prominent role in "landmark agreements" and multilateral negotiations such as the World Health Organization Pandemic Influenza Preparedness Framework (PIP), WIPO's Marrakesh VIP Treaty to Facilitate Access to Published Works for Persons who are Blind, Visually Impaired, or otherwise Print Disabled and the creation of the first special procedure within the UN Human Rights Council on the elimination of discrimination against women in law and practice.

Camacho was appointed Mexican ambassador to Canada in 2019.  He resigned from the post in May 2022 to take up a professorship at the Paul H. Nitze School of Advanced International Studies at Johns Hopkins University. Currently he is a Senior Fellow at the Foreign Policy Institute (SAIS), and a member of the teaching faculty there. At SAIS, he teaches courses on global diplomatic challenges, and North American integration.

References

1964 births
Living people
Ambassadors of Mexico to Belgium
Ambassadors of Mexico to Luxembourg
Universidad Iberoamericana alumni
Georgetown University Law Center alumni
Mexican diplomats